Catherine Ingraham is a professor of architecture in the graduate architecture program at Pratt Institute in New York City, a program for which she was chair from 1999 to 2005.

Biography
Ingraham was born to Gordon Ingraham and Elizabeth Wright Ingraham. Ingraham was raised in Colorado and  earned her doctorate at Johns Hopkins University. Ingraham has held academic appointments at the University of Illinois at Chicago and Iowa State University and been a visiting professor at Princeton, the GSD, and Columbia University, before joining Pratt as chair in 1999.

She is married, with one son, and is one of eight great-granddaughters of Frank Lloyd Wright.

Publications and editing
Ingraham is the author of Architecture, Animal, Human: The Asymmetrical Condition (Routledge 2006), Architecture and the Burdens of Linearity (Yale University Press 1998), and was co-editor of Restructuring Architectural Theory (Northwestern University Press 1986). From 1991-98, Ingraham was an editor, with Michael Hays and Alicia Kennedy, of Assemblage: A Critical Journal of Architecture and Design Culture. Dr. Ingraham has published extensively in academic journals and book collections and lectured at architecture schools nationally and internationally. Throughout her career, she has organized and participated in symposia that advance serious discussions about architecture; in February 2008, she ran a conference at Columbia University on animate life and form entitled "Part Animal."

Design
In 2001, Ingraham was the winner, with architect Laurie Hawkinso, of a design competition and building commission for the Museum of Women's History in New York.

References

Living people
Johns Hopkins University alumni
American women academics
Pratt Institute faculty
Place of birth missing (living people)
Iowa State University faculty
University of Illinois Chicago faculty
American women architects
20th-century births
Year of birth missing (living people)
Frank Lloyd Wright